Hannes Kaljujärv (born on 4 January 1957 in Tartu) is an Estonian actor.

In 1979 he graduated from the University of Tartu with a degree in physical education. In 1979 he also finished courses with Evald Hermaküla's Vanemuine study studio. Since 1979 he is working at the Vanemuine theatre. Besides stage roles he has also participated on several films.

In 2013 he was awarded with Order of the White Star, IV class. His son is actor Rasmus Kaljujärv.

Selected filmography

 1989: Äratus (feature film; role: Komsorg)
 1988: Varastatud kohtumine (feature film; role: Marta's son)
 2002: Nimed marmortahvlil (feature film; role: Militia unit leader)
 2006: Vana daami visiit (feature film; role: citizen)
 2009: Püha Tõnu kiusamine (feature film; role: visitor of the bar)
 2011: Lotte ja kuukivi saladus (animated film; roles: seal Leo (voice) and snowlion Hannes (voice))

References

Living people
1957 births
Estonian male stage actors
Estonian male film actors
Estonian male television actors
20th-century Estonian male actors
21st-century Estonian male actors
Recipients of the Order of the White Star, 4th Class
University of Tartu alumni
Male actors from Tartu